Mike Tyson vs. Lou Savarese, billed as Tyson's Back, was a professional boxing match contested on June 24, 2000.

Background
Mike Tyson was three fights into his latest comeback, which started on January 16, 1999, with a fifth-round knockout victory over former IBF Heavyweight champion Francois Botha. After a nine-month layoff due in large part to a four-month prison stint,[1] Tyson met former WBA Cruiserweight champion Orlin Norris, but the bout ended in a no-contest after Tyson injured Norris with a punch that landed after the bell.[2] Three months later, Tyson had his first-ever fight in the United Kingdom, easily defeating British journeyman Julius Francis by second-round knockout. It was then announced in February 2000 that Tyson would next meet fringe contender Lou Savarese. Initially, the fight was set to take place in Milan, Italy in May,[3]but the bout was postponed after Tyson decided that he needed more time to train.[4] The fight was then moved to Hampden Park in Glasgow, Scotland, and rescheduled for June 24, 2000. Though the decision to allow Tyson to return to the United Kingdom was met with protests because of Tyson's rape conviction,[5] the Glasgow city council voted 10–1 in favour of allowing Tyson to continue on with his match with Savarese.[6]

The fight
The first punch that Tyson landed was a left hand that dropped Savarese to the canvas. Savarese was able to get back up but was met with a furious assault from Tyson. Referee John Coyle attempted to stop the fight at 26 seconds by getting in between the two, but Tyson continued to hammer away at Savarese, taking down Coyle in the process. Shortly after, Tyson's corner entered the ring, and Tyson calmed down. Tyson was awarded the technical knockout victory after only 38 seconds of action. It was the second quickest fight of his career, behind only his 30-second victory over Marvis Frazier in 1986. During his post-fight interview with Jim Gray of Showtime, Tyson called out Lennox Lewis, famously saying, "I want your heart, I want to eat your children. Praise be to Allah. "

References

2000 in boxing
Boxing in Scotland
Sports competitions in Glasgow
2000 in Scottish sport
Savarese
20th century in Glasgow
June 2000 sports events in the United Kingdom
2000s in Glasgow